Kineo may refer to:

Mount Kineo, a peninsula in Maine
, an ironclad gunboat launched 9 October 1861 and sold 9 October 1866
, renamed Montcalm on 24 February 1919